Mehmet Hayri Bey (1879, in Konya – 1928?) was a Turkish officer of both the Ottoman and Turkish Army. He was also a diplomat.

Medals and decorations
Order of Osmanieh with Sword 3rd class
Prussia Iron Cross 2nd class
Gallipoli Star (Ottoman Empire)
Silver Medal of Imtiyaz
Medal of Independence with Red Ribbon

See also
List of high-ranking commanders of the Turkish War of Independence

Sources

External links

1879 births
1928 deaths
Year of death uncertain
People from Konya
People from Konya vilayet
Ottoman Imperial School of Military Engineering alumni
Ottoman Military College alumni
Ottoman Army officers
Ottoman military personnel of the Balkan Wars
Ottoman military personnel of World War I
Turkish Army officers
Turkish military personnel of the Greco-Turkish War (1919–1922)
Recipients of the Iron Cross (1914), 2nd class
Recipients of the Silver Imtiyaz Medal
Recipients of the Medal of Independence with Red Ribbon (Turkey)